James Francis Dayton (born 12 December 1988) is an English professional footballer who plays as a winger for Enfield Town.

Career
Dayton was released by Crystal Palace on 6 May 2009, after being at the club since the age of 10. During his time at Palace he went on two loan spells, both in 2008, to Yeovil Town and Crawley Town.

In November 2009, he accepted an invitation to join the Glenn Hoddle Academy.

He signed for Kilmarnock on a three-year deal in August 2010 after a successful trial period. He suffered a cruciate ligament injury which ruled him out for most of the season after a promising start. He also scored a contender for goal of the season during the same match in which he received the knee injury. However, he returned to first team action in the 1–1 draw with Inverness Caledonian Thistle in the SPL on 9 April 2011 and went on to appear in the remaining games of the 2010–11 season. Concluding the season with a consolation goal from a free-kick in the 5–1 defeat to Rangers on 15 May 2011.

In another good start to the 2011–12 season, Dayton picked up the man of the match award in a game against Hibernian, scoring from a free-kick.

In December 2011, Dayton picked up the Clydesdale Bank Sky Sports goal of the month award for his 35-yard strike against Dundee United on 17 December 2011 which was subsequently named SPL goal of the season.

After rejecting a new three-year contract at Kilmarnock, rendering him a free-agent, Dayton joined Oldham Athletic on 20 May 2013 signing a two-year contract, therefore reuniting with former teammate turned Oldham Athletic manager Lee Johnson.

On 29 January 2015, Dayton joined St Mirren on a loan deal until the end of season 2014–15. Dayton scored after six minutes on his debut for Saints, in a 1–0 victory at Partick Thistle on 30 January 2015.

After completing his loan spell at St Mirren, Dayton became a free agent after Oldham Athletic announced that he had been released by the club.

Dayton made his Cheltenham debut on 24 October 2015, coming off the bench against Havant and Waterlooville.

Dayton signed for Leyton Orient on 1 August 2017. He signed a new contract with the club in July 2019.

After being released by Orient after the 2020-21 season, Dayton signed for National League South side Dulwich Hamlet. He made his debut against Chippenham Town on August 14, 2021.

In July 2022 Dayton signed for Enfield Town of the Isthmian League Premier Division.

Career statistics

Honours

Club

Cheltenham Town
Vanarama National League Winners: 2015-16

Leyton Orient
National League: 2018–19

Notes

References

External links

1988 births
Living people
Footballers from Enfield, London
English footballers
Association football wingers
Crystal Palace F.C. players
Yeovil Town F.C. players
Crawley Town F.C. players
Kilmarnock F.C. players
English Football League players
National League (English football) players
Scottish Premier League players
Bishop's Stortford F.C. players
Oldham Athletic A.F.C. players
St Mirren F.C. players
Cheltenham Town F.C. players
Leyton Orient F.C. players
Scottish Professional Football League players